Yulia Saranova (21 October 1988, Volgograd) is a Russian political figure and deputy of the 8th State Duma. 

From 2012 to 2018, Saranova was a member of the Public Chamber of Tver. In 2013-2020, she was the director of the Tver Center for NGOs in the Association for the Development of Civil Society "Institute for Regional Development". In 2017, Saranova started teaching at the Faculty of Geography and Geoecology, Department of Political Science, Institute of Economics and Management of the Tver State University. Since September 2021, she has served as deputy of the 8th State Duma.

References

1988 births
Living people
United Russia politicians
21st-century Russian politicians
Eighth convocation members of the State Duma (Russian Federation)